The evacuation tip is a port on any glass envelope or vessel inside of which specific gasses or a vacuum must be held. They are very often seen on nixies or vacuum tubes. It is used to evacuate gases from the tube, and in the case of nixies, add the proper mix of gases before being sealed. It provides a convenient port for the amateur glasshacker to introduce gases to alter the performance of the tube. It is also known as the "tubulation" or "pip".

Vacuum tubes